Novoostankovo is a rural locality (a village) in Starokuruchevsky Selsoviet, Bakalinsky District, Bashkortostan, Russia. The population was 12 as of 2010. There are 2 streets.

Geography 
Novoostankovo is located 31 km southeast of Bakaly (the district's administrative centre) by road. Balchikly is the nearest rural locality.

References 

Rural localities in Bakalinsky District